Matthew Mullen (born 24 February 1989, in Adelaide) is an Australian footballer who plays for Campbelltown City in the National Premier Leagues. Matthew is the cousin of Daniel Mullen currently plays for Campbelltown City  and the nephew of Joe Mullen, a former Socceroo.

Club career
Before joining Adelaide United for the A-League 2007-08 season, Mullen played for the Para Hills Knights in the South Australian Premier League and with the Australian Institute of Sport. He made two substitute appearances over his one-year contract with Adelaide and was signed as a youth player for the A-League 2008-09 season. After some impressive performances in the A-League National Youth League Mullen was awarded a place on the bench against Wellington Phoenix; he replaced Angelo Costanzo in the 67th minute playing his part in the 1–1 draw.

Since 2009 he has been loaned out to local Adelaide clubs Adelaide City and Para Hills Knights during the A-League off season.

Career statistics
(Correct as of 22 December 2008)

1 – includes A-League final series statistics
2 – includes FIFA Club World Cup statistics; AFC Champions League statistics are included in season commencing after group stages (i.e. 2008 ACL in 2008–09 A-League season etc.)

Honours
With Australian U-20 football team:
 Weifang Cup (U-18): 2007

References

External links
 Adelaide United profile

1989 births
Living people
Australian soccer players
Association football midfielders
Para Hills Knights players
Australian Institute of Sport soccer players
Adelaide United FC players
Adelaide City FC players
Adelaide Raiders SC players
Campbelltown City SC players
A-League Men players
FFSA Super League players
National Premier Leagues players
Soccer players from Adelaide
South Australian Sports Institute alumni